Collage (also spelled as I Collage) are an Italian pop music group, mainly successful in the  seventies.

Career 
The group formed in  1971 in Olbia, Sardinia, as the result of the merging of two previous groups, MAL P2 and The Angels. In 1976 they won the Castrocaro Music Festival with the romantic "Due ragazzi nel sole", which turned to be a hit and peaked at third place on the Italian hit parade. 

The following year the group entered the main competition at the Sanremo Music Festival ranking second with the song "Tu mi rubi l'anima", which also charted #2 on the Italian hit parade. Following a series of minor hits, starting from the second half of the 1980s the band mainly devoted themselves to live performances and concerts.

Members    
 Tore Fazzi - bass guitar, lead vocalist (1971 - present)
 Piero Fazzi - guitar, voice (1971 - present) 
 Masino Usai - drums (1971 - 1990)
 Piero Pischedda - guitar ((1971 - 1990)
 Pino Ambrosio - keyboards,  voice (1971 - 1990)
 Luciano Degortes - voice (1971 - 1974)
 Mario Chessa - keyboard, violin, voice (1992 - present)
 Francesco Astara - drums (1992 - present)

Discography  
Albums   
 1976 – Due ragazzi nel sole
 1978 – Piano piano m'innamorai di te
 1979 – Concerto d'amore
 1980 – Donna musica
 1982 – Stelle di carta
 2000 - Settantaseiduemila
 2003 - Abitudini e no
 2010 - Non ti dimenticherò

References

External links
   
 
 

Musical groups established in 1971
Italian pop music groups
1971 establishments in Italy